Kenan is a predominantly Turkish masculine given name. 

It may refer to:

 Kenan Evren (1917–2015), Turkish president
 Kenan Erim (1929–1990), Turkish archaeologist
 Kenan Doğulu (born 1974), Turkish singer
 Kenan İmirzalıoğlu (born 1974), Turkish actor
 Kenan Işik (born 1947), Turkish actor
 Kənan Kərimov (born 1976), Azerbaijani footballer
 Kenan Özer (born 1987), Turkish footballer
 Kenan Şahin (born 1984), Turkish-German footballer
 Kenan Şimşek (born 1968), Turkish Olympian sport wrestler and oil wrestler
 Kenan Sipahi (born 1995), Turkish basketball player
 Kenan Sofuoğlu (born 1983), Turkish motorcycle racer and Member of Parliament (AK Parti)
 Kenan Thompson (born 1978), American actor and comedian
 Kenan Horić, Bosnian footballer
 Kenan Kodro, Bosnian footballer
Kenan Yaghi (born 1976), Syrian politician

See also
 Kenan (disambiguation)

Hebrew-language names
Hebrew-language surnames
Turkish masculine given names
Bosniak masculine given names